Kobda is a district of Aktobe Region in Kazakhstan. The administrative center of the district is the aul of Kobda. Population:

References

Districts of Kazakhstan
Aktobe Region